Gotha is a census-designated place (CDP) in Orange County, Florida, United States. Gotha is located between Ocoee and Windermere and had a population of 1,915 at the 2010 census, up from 731 as recorded by the 2000 census. It is part of the Orlando–Kissimmee Metropolitan Statistical Area. It is the resting place of the famous painter Bob Ross.

History
A post office opened at Gotha in 1883. The town of Gotha was founded in 1885 by German immigrant H. A. Hempel. Hempel Avenue, the "main street" of Gotha, is named in his honor. After buying 1000 acres, the majority of acreage still designated as United States Territory, he laid out a town and named it after his birthplace of Gotha, Germany. He then mailed promotional pamphlets to northern cities and to Europe advertising the warm climate and mild winters. In time, several German American families moved to and settled in and around Gotha.

Geography
Gotha is located at  (28.5317, -81.5218).

According to the United States Census Bureau, the CDP has a total area of 5.1 km2 (2.0 mi2), of which 4.6 km2 (1.8 mi2) is land and 0.5 km2 (0.2 mi2) (10.20%) is water.

Climate

Gotha experiences a Humid subtropical climate (cfa) with all year precipitation, warm to hot summers, wet and mild to warm winters.

Demographics

As of the census of 2000, there were 731 people, 249 households, and 210 families residing in the CDP. The population density was 160.4/km2 (415.5/mi2). There were 264 housing units at an average density of 57.9/km2 (150.0/mi2). The racial makeup of the CDP was 88.78% White, 4.38% African American, 0.55% Native American, 3.56% Asian, 1.23% from other races, and 1.50% from two or more races. Hispanic or Latino of any race were 7.11% of the population.

There were 249 households, out of which 46.2% had children under the age of 18 living with them, 71.9% were married couples living together, 7.6% had a female householder with no husband present, and 15.3% were non-families. 12.4% of all households were made up of individuals, and 4.8% had someone living alone who was 65 years of age or older. The average household size was 2.92 and the average family size was 3.18.

In the CDP, the population was spread out, with 28.9% under the age of 18, 5.7% from 18 to 24, 33.0% from 25 to 44, 25.3% from 45 to 64, and 7.1% who were 65 years of age or older. The median age was 36 years. For every 100 females, there were 97.0 males. For every 100 females age 18 and over, there were 102.3 males.

The median income for a household in the CDP was $59,808, and the median income for a family was $76,286. Males had a median income of $42,143 versus $42,692 for females. The per capita income for the CDP was $32,734. About 9.8% of families and 20.0% of the population were below the poverty line, including 42.5% of those under age 18 and none of those age 65 or over.

Education
Gotha is within Orange County Public Schools. Residents are zoned to Thornebrooke Elementary School, Gotha Middle School, and Olympia High School.

References

External links
 Orange County Schools
 West Orange Chamber of Commerce

Census-designated places in Orange County, Florida
Greater Orlando
Census-designated places in Florida
1885 establishments in Florida
Populated places established in 1885